"Tainted Love" is a song composed by Ed Cobb, formerly of American group the Four Preps, which was originally recorded by Gloria Jones in 1964.  It attained worldwide fame after being covered and reworked by British synthpop duo Soft Cell in 1981 and has since been covered by numerous groups and artists.

Gloria Jones versions (1964; released 1965) (second recording 1976)
American artist Gloria Jones made the first recording of "Tainted Love" in 1964; the song was written and produced by Ed Cobb and arranged by Lincoln Mayorga. It was the B-side of her 1965 single "My Bad Boy's Comin' Home", which was a commercial flop, failing to chart in either the US or the UK. According to Nick Talevski, before Jones recorded the song, Cobb had offered it to the Standells, whom he managed and produced, but they rejected it. The Standells say that the song was never offered to them, and that they were not signed to Cobb's company Greengrass Productions until 1966, some two years after Jones's recording.

In 1973, British club DJ Richard Searling purchased a copy of the almost decade-old single while on a trip to the United States. The track's Motown-influenced sound (featuring a fast tempo, horns, electric rhythm guitar and female backing vocals) fit in perfectly with the music favoured by those involved in the UK's Northern soul club scene of the early 1970s, and Searling popularised the song at the Northern soul club Va Va's in Bolton, and later, at Wigan Casino.

Owing to the new-found underground popularity of the song, Jones re-recorded "Tainted Love" in 1976 and released it as a single, but it also failed to chart. This version was released on her album Vixen and was produced by her boyfriend Marc Bolan.

In 2014, NME ranked it number 305 in their list of the 500 Greatest Songs of All Time.

Soft Cell version (1981)

English vocal-and-synth duo Soft Cell became aware of the song through its status as a UK "Northern soul" hit. In 2010, DJ Ian "Frank" Dewhirst claimed he was the first person to play the song for Marc Almond, the vocalist for Soft Cell. Some time after, Soft Cell began performing the song in their live setlist, choosing it instead of Frankie Valli and the Four Seasons' "The Night" (a song they would go on to record in 2003). Eventually, a Phonogram Records A&R manager Roger Ames opted the band to record the single at a London-based Advision Studios, with producer Mike Thorne. There, Soft Cell's version was recorded in a day and a half with Almond's first vocal take being used on the record. Thorne commented that he was surprised by the choice as he had not been impressed by Jones's 1976 version on hearing it, but was impressed by the new arrangement and Almond's sinister vocal: "You could smell the coke on that second, Northern Soul version, it was really so over-ramped and so frantic. It was good for the dance floor, but I didn't like the record...when Soft Cell performed the song I heard a very novel sound and a very nice voice, so off we went."

The Soft Cell recording features a slower tempo than Jones's version and is in the key of G rather than the original C to match Marc Almond's lower voice. Synthesizers and rhythm machines replace the original's guitars, bass, drums, and horns.

Phonogram Records chose to release "Tainted Love" in 1981 as Soft Cell's second single (their first was "Memorabilia", which did not chart). The label's representatives implied that this single would be Soft Cell's final release on Some Bizzare if it did not sell. The 12" single version (extended dance version) was a medley, transitioning to a cover of the Supremes' "Where Did Our Love Go" halfway through the song, which gives a progressive dimension to this version.

Thanks to a memorable performance on the BBC's Top of the Pops chart show, "Tainted Love" reached number one on the UK Singles Chart, and was known as the best-selling single of 1981 in the UK, until the Official Charts Company recalculated the data in 2021 (giving the title to "Don't You Want Me" by The Human League). "Tainted Love" had 1.05 million sales in the UK in 1981, with that total increasing to 1.35 million copies as of August 2017.

Buoyed by the then-dominant new wave sound of the time, "Tainted Love" became a major hit in the US during the Second British Invasion, with the song spending a then-record breaking 43 weeks on the US Billboard Hot 100. On the US chart dated January 16, 1982, the song entered the Billboard Hot 100 at number 90. It appeared to peak at number 64 and fell to number 100 on February 27. After spending a second week at number 100, it started climbing again. It took 19 weeks to crack the American Top 40 and reached number 8 during the summer of 1982.

A video was recorded specially for Soft Cell's video album Non-Stop Exotic Video Show, featuring David Ball as a cricketer meeting Marc Almond in a toga on what seems to be Mount Olympus.

Soft Cell's version of "Tainted Love" ranked number 5 on VH1's 100 Greatest One Hit Wonders of the 1980s. It was also heavily sampled on Rihanna's 2006 single "SOS" and the Veronicas's 2007 single "Hook Me Up". In 2015, the song was voted by the British public as the nation's fourth favourite 1980s number one in a poll for ITV.

Soft Cell/Marc Almond version (1991)
A re-recorded version of the song was issued in 1991, seven years after Soft Cell's dissolution in 1984, as a tie-in to the compilation album Memorabilia – The Singles (which reached number 8 in the UK albums chart in June 1991). "Tainted Love '91" was a follow-up to "Say Hello, Wave Goodbye '91", which was another re-recorded/remixed version of an earlier single from the Soft Cell/Marc Almond compilation. "Tainted Love '91" became another Top 40 hit from the collection and peaked at number 5 in the UK charts, making it Soft Cell's sixth Top 10 hit (as records with re-recorded vocals were seen as a new hit by the chart compilers of the time)

The video for the version, directed by Peter Christopherson, features a man pacing at night and dancing with starry apparitions, while Almond sings amongst the stars. Christopherson's band Coil had covered "Tainted Love" in 1985, with a music video that included a cameo appearance by Almond.

Charts

Weekly charts

Year-end charts

Certifications

Marilyn Manson version (2001)

American rock band Marilyn Manson covered "Tainted Love" with an arrangement based on Soft Cell's version. It was released in November 2001 as a single from the Not Another Teen Movie soundtrack. The accompanying music video featured cast members Chyler Leigh, Mia Kirshner, Chris Evans and Jaime Pressly. It was later included as a bonus track on international editions of the band's following album, The Golden Age of Grotesque. The eponymous vocalist said that he was not "really thinking about '80s nostalgia" during the recording, while recognizing it as a main concept behind the soundtrack.

"Tainted Love" topped the charts in Portugal and peaked within the top ten of the charts in the United Kingdom. It also peaked within the top ten of the charts throughout the rest of Europe, including Austria, Denmark, Germany, Italy and Norway. It was nominated for the Kerrang! Award for Best Single in 2002, and won the Kerrang! Award for Best Video. It was also nominated for Best Video at the 2002 Q Awards.

Charts

Weekly charts

Year-end charts

Certifications

Release history

In popular culture
The song features prominently in the 2012 British black comedy Sightseers — Soft Cell's 12" mix as the couple leaves on their caravanning holiday and Gloria Jones' version over the closing credits. Another song of which two versions were used was Donovan's "Season of the Witch", as performed by Vanilla Fudge (1968) and that by Julie Driscoll with Brian Auger & The Trinity (1967).

References

Bibliography

External links
 
 

1964 songs
1981 singles
1982 singles
2001 singles
European Hot 100 Singles number-one singles
Marilyn Manson (band) songs
Number-one singles in Australia
Number-one singles in Germany
Number-one singles in Portugal
Number-one singles in South Africa
RPM Top Singles number-one singles
Ultratop 50 Singles (Flanders) number-one singles
Soft Cell songs
Jan Howard songs
Songs written by Ed Cobb
UK Singles Chart number-one singles
Song recordings produced by Mike Thorne
Northern soul songs
Some Bizzare Records singles
Sire Records singles
Warner Records singles
Nothing Records singles
Interscope Records singles
Maverick Records singles
Vee-Jay Records singles
Brit Award for British Single